Just Like Our Parents is a 2017 Brazilian drama film directed by Laís Bodanzky. It was screened in the Panorama section at the 67th Berlin International Film Festival.

Cast

 Maria Ribeiro as Rosa 
  as "Dado" 
 Clarisse Abujamra as Clarice
  as Pedro
 Jorge Mautner as Homero
 Herson Capri as Roberto Nathan
  as Nara 
 Annalara Prates as Juliana

References

External links
 

2017 films
2017 drama films
2010s Portuguese-language films
Brazilian drama films
Films directed by Laís Bodanzky